Rothschildia is a genus of moths in the family Saturniidae first described by Augustus Radcliffe Grote in 1896.

Species are found in North America and South America from the United States to Argentina.

Species
Rothschildia amoena Jordan, 1911
Rothschildia anikae Brechlin & Meister, 2010
Rothschildia arethusa (Walker, 1855)
Rothschildia aricia (Walker, 1855)
Rothschildia aurota (Cramer, 1775)
Rothschildia belus (Maassen, 1873)
Rothschildia chiris W. Rothschild, 1907
Rothschildia cincta (Tepper, 1883)
Rothschildia condor (Staudinger, 1894)
Rothschildia erycina (Shaw, 1796)
Rothschildia forbesi Benjamin, 1934
Rothschildia hesperus (Linnaeus, 1758)
Rothschildia hopfferi (C. & R. Felder, 1859)
Rothschildia interaricia Brechlin & Meister, 2010
Rothschildia jacobaeae (Walker, 1855)
Rothschildia jorulla (Westwood, 1854)
Rothschildia jorulloides (Dognin, 1895)
Rothschildia lebeau (Guerin-Meneville, 1868)
Rothschildia maurus (Burmeister, 1879)
Rothschildia orizaba (Westwood, 1854)
Rothschildia paucidentata Lemaire, 1971
Rothschildia prionia W. Rothschild, 1907
Rothschildia renatae Lampe, 1985
Rothschildia roxana Schaus, 1905
Rothschildia schreiteriana Breyer & Orfila, 1945
Rothschildia triloba W. Rothschild, 1907
Rothschildia tucumani (Dognin, 1901)
Rothschildia xanthina Rothschild, 1907
Rothschildia zacateca (Westwood, 1854)

Gallery

References